Bredbandsbolaget (The Broadband Company, abbreviated BBB, B2 or BB) was a Swedish Internet service provider (ISP) owned by Telenor. It was founded in 1998 with a focus on high-speed Internet connection for homes and businesses using optical fiber. It was the second largest ISP in Sweden in 2003.

On 15 May 2018 it merged with its parent company Telenor Sverige.

References 

Telenor
Internet service providers of Sweden
Telecommunications companies established in 1998